Arkitema Architects is a Danish architectural firm headquartered in Aarhus, with branch offices in Copenhagen, Malmö, Stockholm and Oslo. Arkitema Architects was founded in 1969 in Aarhus, and nowadays has about 400 employees with its main activity in Scandinavia.

Arkitema Architects is owned by Danish engineering company Cowi.

History
The firm was founded in 1969 as Arkitektgruppen Aarhus by five students from the Aarhus School of Architecture after they won a competition for the design of an expansion of Køge Town Hall. They were Helge Tindal, Ole Nielsson, Michael Harrebæk, Eriling Stadager and Lars Due. Today Arkitema Architects has 14 partners.

In 1990, Arkitektgruppen Aarhus won the Nykredit Architecture Prize. In 2003 the firm changed its name to Arkitema Architects and in 2004 it merged with AA Arkitekter to be able to expand internationally.

In 2011, as part of its continued efforts to grow on the Scandinavian market, Arkitema Architects acquired majority ownership of Swedish Dot Arkitekter. In 2015 Arkitema Architects opened an office in Oslo, Norway.

In late 2018, Danish consultant and engineering company Cowi bought Arkitema Architects.

Partnership
Arkitema Architects includes an urban design department (Arkitema Urban Design) and a consulting department (Arkitema Consulting). The company has teamed up with skilled people from several disciplines, including the fields of engineering, sustainability, management and construction.

As of 1 January 2018, Arkitema had the following partners:

Senior partners: Jørgen Bach, Peter Hartmann Berg, Wilhelm Berner-Nielsen, Thomas Birkkjær, Thomas Carstens, Glenn Elmbæk, Per Fischer, Ola Göransson, Dorthe Keis, Kim Risager, Poul Schülein, Anne Guri Grimsby og Aasmund Bjørnstad.

Partners: Anders Halgren, Kristina Peters, Mette Julie Skibsholt, Håkan Sandhagen og Søren Haugsted.

Associated partners: Mette Baarup, Eric Engström, Viktor Ahnfelt, Emil Carstens, Birgitte Gade Ernst, Carsten Jensen, Heidi Hjort Thuesen.

Selected projects

Arkitema has designed a broad range of architectural projects, from minor expansions and renovations to large redevelopment, infrastructural, residential and urban design projects. Some of the most notable and representative projects from Arkitema includes the following:

Completed
 Køge Town Hall, Køge (1976) - Expansion of an old listed building
 Vamdrup Rådhus, Vamdrup (1981) - Town Hall
 Håndværkerparken, Aarhus (1981) - Postmodern lowrise residential quarter
 Police station, Helsingør (1991)
 Arosgården, Aarhus (1993) - Postmodern office building
 Fåborg Swim Stadium, Fåborg (1996)
 Enhjørningens Gård, Christianshavn, Copenhagen (2001) - Apartment block
 Hellerup School, Hellerup (2002) - Public school
 Danish Crown, Horsens (2002) - Slaugtherhouse
 Kobbertårnet, Amerika Plads, Copenhagen (2004) - High-rise office building
 Mary's, Vejle (2008) - Shopping arcade (closed)
 Bellahøj Swim Stadium, Copenhagen (2009) - Renovation and landscape designs
 Sluseholmen Canal District, Copenhagen (2009) - Apartment blocks (redevelopment)
 Mikado House, Ørestad, Copenhagen (2010) - Mixed use (offices and shops)
 CeresByen, Aarhus (2013) - Urban design of a new neighbourhood
 Aarhus City Tower, Aarhus (2014) - High-rise hotel
 VIA University College Campus Aarhus C, Aarhus (2015) - Educational institution

In progress
 Østfold Hospital, Østfold, Norway (u/c)
 Thor highrise, Randers, Denmark
 Bolig+, Aalborg, Denmark
 Vibeeng School, Faxe, Denmark
 Bindesbøll Byen, Aarhus, Denmark (from 2019) - New city borough (redevelopment)
 Oksenøya, Oslo, Norway (from 2019) - New city borough

References

External links 

 

Architecture firms of Denmark
Companies based in Aarhus
Design companies established in 1969
Danish companies established in 1969